Tom Boere (born 24 November 1992) is a Dutch professional footballer who plays as a striker for NAC Breda in the Eerste Divisie.

Club career

Early years
Born in Breda, Netherlands, Tom Boere grew up in Terneuzen and began his footballing career in Ghent, Belgium, playing in the youth teams of KAA Gent as a striker, before being recruited by Ajax to join their youth team. Having served as a striker for the Jong Ajax team, Boere made his debut and only appearance for the senior side for Ajax in the 2011–12 season, in a friendly match against Go Ahead Eagles from Deventer on 10 November 2011. He scored the last goal in a 3–1 home win having come on as 70th-minute substitute for Dmitri Bulykin. He made no appearances in a regular season or cup match for the senior squad, and subsequently transferred to Gent as a free transfer in the winter transfer window.

Gent
Boere returned to Gent, where he spent much of his youth career, during the winter transfer window of the 2011–12 season on a free transfer from Ajax. He made his senior debut in Belgium coming on as an 86th-minute substitute for Rafinha in the home match against Zulte Waregem on 21 January 2012, a 0–0 draw. During the 2013–14 season, he played on loan for Hoogstraten in the Belgian Second Division.

Eindhoven and Oss
In June 2014, Boere signed a three-year deal with Dutch Eerste Divisie side FC Eindhoven. He moved to FC Oss in summer 2016. He managed to score 33 goals in 38 appearances for the club, winning the 2016–17 Eerste Divisie Golden Boot.

Twente
In June 2017, Boere signed a three-year contract with Twente, who had finished seventh in the Eredivisie the year before. He was set to be the replacement of Enes Ünal, who had left after his loan deal expired.

Türkgücü
On 27 July 2020, Boere joined Türkgücü München. His coach Alexander Schmidt initially utilised him next to the consistently efficient Petar Slišković in the centre of attack. After three goals in seven games, Sercan Sararer was briefly moved forward from the attacking midfield before Mounir Bouziane, another newcomer, finally removed the Dutchman completely from seeing the field.

SV Meppen
After the investor of Türkgücü Munich, Hasan Kivran, announced his withdrawal at the end of December 2020 and thus left the future of the club in uncertainty, 28-year-old Boere moved to league rivals SV Meppen in early-January 2021 – a team which had scored the sixth fewest amount of goals in the league at the time. He signed a contract until the end of the season. He made his debut for the club on 9 January in a 1–0 win over 1. FC Saarbrücken, playing the entire match. On 19 February, Boere scored his first goal for the club which secured a 2–1 home win over Hallescher FC. Earlier in the match, he had provided an assist to Hassan Amin.

Cambuur
In 2021, Boere joined Cambuur.

NAC Breda
In January 2023, Boere joined NAC Breda on a two-and-a-half year deal.

Honours
Twente
 Eerste Divisie: 2018–19

References

External links
 
 

1992 births
Living people
Footballers from Breda
People from Terneuzen
Footballers from Zeeland
Association football forwards
Dutch footballers
AFC Ajax players
Jong Ajax players
K.A.A. Gent players
FC Eindhoven players
TOP Oss players
FC Twente players
KFC Uerdingen 05 players
Türkgücü München players
SV Meppen players
SC Cambuur players
NAC Breda players
Belgian Pro League players
Challenger Pro League players
Eredivisie players
Eerste Divisie players
3. Liga players
Dutch expatriate footballers
Expatriate footballers in Belgium
Expatriate footballers in Germany
Dutch expatriate sportspeople in Belgium
Dutch expatriate sportspeople in Germany
Netherlands youth international footballers